Sandy Point, Virginia may refer to:
Sandy Point, Northumberland County, Virginia
Sandy Point, Westmoreland County, Virginia
Sandy Point State Forest, located in King William County, Virginia